Minuscule 887 (in the Gregory-Aland numbering), is an 11th-century Greek minuscule manuscript of the New Testament on parchment, with a commentary.

Description 

The codex contains the text of the Gospel of John, with a commentary, on 197 parchment leaves (size ). The text is written in one column per page, 38 lines per page.

Text 
The Greek text of the codex is a representative of the Byzantine. Kurt Aland placed it in Category V.

History 

According to F. H. A. Scrivener and C. R. Gregory it was written in the 11th century. Henry Stevenson dated it to the 10th century. Currently the manuscript is dated by the INTF to the 11th century.

It once belonged to Matariotes, a metropolitan. The manuscript was described by Henry Stevenson. Gregory saw it in 1886.

The manuscript was added to the list of New Testament manuscripts by Scrivener (699e), Gregory (887e).

Currently the manuscript is housed at the Vatican Library (Reg. gr. 9), in Rome.

See also 

 List of New Testament minuscules (1–1000)
 Biblical manuscript
 Textual criticism

References

Further reading 

 
 Henry Stevenson, Codices manuscripti Graeci Reginae Svecorum et Pii Pp. II. Bibliothecae Vaticanae, descripti praeside I.B. Cardinali Pitra, Rom 1888, pp. 7-8.

External links 
 

Greek New Testament minuscules
11th-century biblical manuscripts
Manuscripts of the Vatican Library